Terry Fan and Eric Fan are American-born Canadian children's book writers and illustrators, known collectively as the Fan Brothers. They made their picture book debut with The Night Gardener (2016), which was named an ALA Notable Children's Book.

Biography 
The siblings were both born in the United States (Terry in Illinois and Eric in Hawaii), and grew up in Toronto, Canada. They both studied at OCAD University. 

Known professionally as the Fan Brothers, they made their picture book debut in 2016 with The Night Gardener, which they wrote and illustrated. The book earned positive reviews in Kirkus, Publishers Weekly, Quill & Quire, and BookPage. The Night Gardener was named an ALA Notable Children's Book and was a finalist for the Cybils Award for children's literature.

In 2018, the Fan Brothers published Ocean Meets Sky. A review in Quill & Quire called the book's illustrations "truly breathtaking". The book was shortlisted for the CILIP Kate Greenaway Medal for children's book illustration and for the Governor General's Award for English-language children's illustration. 

The Fan Brothers collaborated with their youngest brother, Devin Fan, on his book debut, The Barnabus Project (2020). The book, released in September 2020, has earned positive reviews in the Canadian Review of Materials and Kirkus. The book won the Governor General's Award for English-language children's illustration at the 2020 Governor General's Awards.

Selected works

As authors and illustrators 

 The Night Gardener (2016) 
 Ocean Meets Sky (2018) 
 The Barnabus Project (2020), with Devin Fan

As illustrators 

 The Darkest Dark (2016), by Chris Hadfield 
 The Antlered Ship (2018), by Dashka Slater 
 The Scarecrow (2019), by Beth Ferry

References 

Canadian children's book illustrators
Canadian children's writers
American emigrants to Canada
Governor General's Award-winning children's illustrators